Taviran may refer to:
 Taviran-e Olya
 Taviran-e Sofla

See also
Tavilan (disambiguation)